Rainwater usually refers to the water from rain.

Rainwater may also refer to:

 Rainwater Basin, a loess plain in south-central Nebraska
 Rainwater Creek, a tributary stream of Lake Fork Creek in Northeast Texas
 Rainwater Observatory and Planetarium, located in French Camp, Mississippi
 The Rainwater LP, 2010 album by Citizen Cope
 Rain water, literal meaning of Yushui, a Chinese solar term

As a surname
 Edwin R. Rainwater (1813–1850), a soldier in the Texas Army during the Texas Revolution
 Gregg Rainwater (born 1966), American actor
 James Rainwater (1917–1986), American physicist
 Jody Rainwater (1920–2011), American bluegrass musician and radio personality
 John Rainwater (created 1952), fictional mathematician and author of functional analysis papers
 Lee Rainwater (1928–2015), American sociologist and professor of sociology at Harvard University
 Marvin Rainwater (1925–2013), American country and rockabilly singer and songwriter 
 Paul Rainwater, Louisiana government official
 Richard Rainwater (1944–2015), American investor and philanthropist
 Rotimi Rainwater (born 1970),  American writer, director, and producer